The 43rd Guldbagge Awards ceremony, presented by the Swedish Film Institute, honored the best Swedish films of 2007, and took place on 21 January 2008. You, the Living directed by Roy Andersson was presented with the award for Best Film.

Winner and nominees

Awards

See also
 80th Academy Awards
 65th Golden Globe Awards
 61st British Academy Film Awards
 14th Screen Actors Guild Awards
 13th Critics' Choice Awards
 28th Golden Raspberry Awards

References

External links
Official website
Guldbaggen on Facebook
Guldbaggen on Twitter

2008 in Sweden
2007 film awards
Guldbagge Awards ceremonies
2000s in Stockholm
January 2008 events in Europe